Narcissus dubius is a species of the genus Narcissus (daffodils) in the family Amaryllidaceae. It is classified in Section Tazettae. It is native to northeastern Spain.

References 

dubius
Garden plants
Flora of Spain